WBRQ (91.9 FM) is a radio station licensed to serve the community of LaGrange, Georgia. The station is owned by Ben Jordan Communications Corporation, and airs a blues/gospel format.

The station was assigned the call sign WGLG by the Federal Communications Commission on June 25, 2008. The station changed its call sign to WWOF on November 7, 2008, and to WBRQ on February 4, 2009.

References

External links
 Official Website
 

Radio stations established in 2011
2011 establishments in Georgia (U.S. state)
Blues radio stations
Gospel radio stations in the United States
Companies based in Troup County, Georgia
BRQ